Toee may refer to:
a mancala game
 An acronym for The Temple of Elemental Evil.